Nimrin was a Palestinian Arab town of 320 that was captured and depopulated by Israel during the 1948 Arab-Israeli War.

History
Nimrin stood on the site of Kfar Nimra when Palestine was ruled by the Roman Empire. Its inhabitants were Jews when Saint Peter and Saint James visited the town in 30 CE.

Ottoman era
Nimrin was incorporated into the Ottoman Empire in the early sixteenth century CE, and by the 1596 tax records the village was under the administration of the nahiya ("subdistrict") of Tiberias, part of  Safad Sanjak. It had a population of 20 households, an estimated  110 persons, all Muslim.

A map from Napoleon's invasion of 1799 by Pierre Jacotin  showed the place, named as Nemen.

In the nineteenth century, Nimrin grew to become a stone-built village of 250 Muslim people. It was described as being built on the slope of a hill, surrounded by arable land. The Ottomans founded an elementary school in the village.

A population list from about 1887 showed  Nimrin to have  about  300  inhabitants;  all Muslims.

British Mandate era
In 1922, Nimrin became a part of the British Mandate of Palestine and in the 1922 census of Palestine,   Nemrin had a  population of 273; all Muslims, increasing in the 1931 census to 316, still all Muslims, in  a total of 71 houses.

The main economic sectors were farming and livestock, with grain being the most important crop, followed by vegetables. The Ottoman school was closed down during this period.

In  the 1945 statistics  the population consisted of 320 Muslims,  and the total land area was  12,019 dunams.  Of this,  Arabs used 7,905 dunams for cereals, 335 for plantations and irrigable land, while 64 dunams were classified as built-up (urban) area.

1948 war, and aftermath
During the 1948 Arab-Israeli War, Nimrin fell into Israeli hands on July 17, 1948, after nearby Lubya was captured at the end of Operation Dekel. Its entire population of 320 (1945) fled for unclear reasons. According to Walid Khalidi, "the site and a major part of the lands are surrounded by a fence."

See also
Depopulated Palestinian locations in Israel

References

Bibliography

External links
Welcome to Nimrin
Nimrin,  Zochrot
Survey of Western Palestine, Map 6:  IAA, Wikimedia commons 
Nimrin, from the Khalil Sakakini Cultural Center
Nimrin photos,  from Dr. Moslih Kanaaneh

Arab villages depopulated during the 1948 Arab–Israeli War
District of Tiberias